The TV Tennis Electrotennis (Japanese: テレビテニス, Hepburn romanzination: Terebitenisu, meaning Television Tennis, commonly abbreviated as TV Tennis or Electrotennis) is a dedicated first-generation home video game console that was released by Epoch Co. (developed in cooperation with Magnavox) on September 12, 1975 for 19,000 Japanese yen only in Japan. It was the first video game console ever released in Japan.

It released several months before the release of Home Pong in North America. One unique feature of the TV Tennis Electrotennis is that the console is connected wirelessly to a TV, functioning through an UHF antenna. Depending on the source, it sold about 10,000, 20,000 or 3 million units in its lifetime, including about 5,000 units in the first year.

Legacy 
The successor of the TV Tennis Electrotennis is the TV Game System 10 from 1977. It includes as a light gun a plastic replica of a Mauser C96; the C96 replica was also usable with its next console, the Epoch Cassette Vision, created in 1981.

The wireless broadcast functionality of the TV Tennis Electrotennis got Nintendo designer Masayuki Uemura to consider adding that capability to the Famicom (Nintendo Entertainment System), though he ultimately did not pursue it to keep system costs low.

References

External links 
 Japan's 1st Video Game Console was released 40 Years ago

Dedicated consoles
First-generation video game consoles
Home video game consoles
Wireless